The Spanish Rogue is a 1673 comedy play by the English writer Thomas Duffet. It was first performed at the Theatre Royal, Drury Lane by the King's Company.

The original cast included William Harris as Don Fenise, Edward Lydall as  Don Alonzo, Marmaduke Watson as Don Manuel, Martin Powell as Larasco, John Coysh as Mingo, Philip Griffin as  Sanchez, Elizabeth Boutell as Alcinda, Katherine Corey as Teresa and Elizabeth Knepp as Leonella.

References

Bibliography
 Van Lennep, W. The London Stage, 1660-1800: Volume One, 1660-1700. Southern Illinois University Press, 1960.

1673 plays
West End plays
Plays by Thomas Duffet
Restoration comedy